Open is a long-form piece of music released in digital form by Yes former lead singer Jon Anderson, released in 2011.

About the EP
Anderson began work on "Open" in the spring of 2010, when he began to lay down its foundation on his 19th Century guitar. From the start, he knew that it would become a long form musical composition. Later on, orchestration was added by Stefan Podell.

Track listing
Open 20:54
Sun is Calling
Please To Remember
Who Better Than Love
Sun it Sings You / Given Chase

Credits 
Music & lyrics written by Jon Anderson with additional music by Stefan Podell.

Personnel 
Jon Anderson – vocals, acoustic guitar
Stefan Podell – music and orchestration, 6 and 12 string guitars, classical guitar, electric guitar, percussion, bass, additional vocals
Zach Page – classical and electric guitar 
Kevin Shima – acoustic guitar, vocals
Zach Tenorio-Miller – piano, organ
Alexandra Cutler-Fetkewicz, Jon Fink and Susan Lerner – string arrangement and recording
Brian Hobart – percussion
Stephan Junca – drum kit, African percussion
Charles Scott – drum kit
Jane Luttenberger Anderson – "angel vocals"
Robert Foster, Ian O'Rourke, Madelyn Frey, Jacob Stringfellow, Aaron Wolfe and Amy Stevens – Choral Via Cal Poly A Cappella Group
Billy James – additional backing vocals

Recording 
Engineer – Mike Fraumeni 
Mastered by Sakis Anastopoulos

Production 
Produced by Jon and Jane Anderson.

Artwork 
Artwork by Jay Nungesser and John Amick

Reviews

Something Else Reviews
"A conceptually epic piece, filled with wonderment, musical twists and a theme as broad as it is hopeful... Quite frankly, this is what Jon Anderson does. And it's terrifically engaging, after too long spent fitting his muse into the ever-dilating structures of Yes's modern-day prog-pop, to hear Anderson doing it again."

References

2011 albums
Jon Anderson albums